The Osheaga Music and Arts Festival is a multi-day music festival in Montreal, Quebec, that is held every summer at Parc Jean-Drapeau on Île Sainte-Hélène. The festival takes place on six stages with various audience capacities. Translated from their French equivalents, they are called "River Stage," "Mountain Stage," "Green Stage," "Trees Stage," "Valley Stage," and "Zone Piknic Electronik." Each performance area is paired with a sponsor. Band set times fluctuate based on the status of the performer within the festival. Emerging artists play 30-minute sets, and headliners conclude each day with 90-minute plus sets. The 2006 festival attracted a crowd of around 25,000 people. The 2012 festival reached its 40,000 attendance capacity each day.

Description
Since 2006, the Osheaga Music and Arts festival has established itself as the most important festival of its genre in Canada. With its numerous outdoor stages located at parc Jean-Drapeau on Montreal's Sainte-Hélène's Island, Osheaga attracted 120 000 music lovers from North America and Europe last year. A huge celebration dedicated to music and visual arts, Osheaga has given itself the objective of discovering local and national emerging talent offering them the opportunity to play alongside some of the biggest international artists in the business including: Coldplay, The Killers, Iggy & The Stooges, Sonic Youth, The Roots, Rufus Wainwright, Arcade Fire, Weezer and Eminem. Over the course of several days, approximately 100 bands take to the various stages at parc Jean-Drapeau and across the city in the festive ambiance that only a Montreal summer can provide. Osheaga also holds a series of concerts and exhibitions in several locations around the city during the week leading up to the main event.  For its ninth edition, the Osheaga Music and Arts festival, presented by Virgin Mobile, promises an exhilarating experience with, among others: Jack White, Outkast and Skrillex.

In the past 2 editions, the festival has introduced "Osheaga Play", an interactive play area and social media integrated photo system.  The "play zone" features carnival games where festival goers can play games and accumulate points to cash in for prizes.  Osheaga Play also features roaming photographers who can scan participants' RFID bracelets so the photos will be directly uploaded to their social media.

Etymology

Osheaga is a title given to the particular region of Canada now known as Montreal. The name is first attested in written records by Jacques Cartier, one of the first European settlers there, when he communicated with the local St. Lawrence Iroquoian people, and recorded the name of their settlement as Hochelaga. Most linguists have ascribed the name to a francisation of either osekare, meaning "beaver path" or "beaver dam", or osheaga, meaning "big rapids" in reference to the nearby Lachine Rapids. An alternative explanation has been claimed in which "Osheaga" meant "people of the shaking hands", tricking Cartier into recording the settlement's name as a word that was actually a mocking comment directed at him; in some versions of this story, the Iroquoian people were bewildered by Cartier waving his hands wildly to attract their attention as he first approached the settlement in his boat, while in others they were bewildered by his European custom of greeting them with a handshake.

These latter explanations are favoured by the Mohawk people at Kahnawake, as in the Mohawk language the phrase "people of the hands" can be expressed as "O she ha ga" or "Oshahaka". They cannot, however, be easily confirmed or refuted, as the few known surviving remnants of the extinct Laurentian language that was spoken by the Iroquoian people at Hochelaga are only moderately similar to the distantly related Mohawk language, which was not spoken anywhere even remotely close to Hochelaga at the time of Cartier's contact.

History
The inaugural edition of Osheaga termed itself a "music and arts festival." It took place on Labour Day weekend, September 2–3, 2006. Nick Farkas, a concert buyer for Gillett Entertainment Group at the time, presented the event. Noticing a lack of similarly themed music venues on the East Coast, Farkas hoped to take advantage of Montreal’s newfound credibility among indie music listeners. "People love Montreal. Let's not kid ourselves—that makes it attractive (to bands), but it's hard for people to take a chance on a first year fest." Farkas attempted to establish a lineup of underground artists that would appeal to both discerning fans and the broader public. Organizers aspired to transform the festival into a destination event. "That's the goal—to get people talking about it, and coming from all over," said Farkas in 2006.

Osheaga's sophomore year began to take stride with the Smashing Pumpkins, M.I.A, Feist, and the Arctic Monkeys. Accordingly, organizers hoped to imitate the previous year's success by hosting an assortment of indie performers. "The fest offers an array of quality, mid-level alternative bands. But put them together—here's the key to Osheaga's success—and you have a headliner by committee." In keeping with the festival's name, Osheaga organizers also incorporated several Montreal-based bands including the Sam Roberts Band, Stars, Dumas, Sixtoo, Pawa Up First, Pony Up, the Royal Mountain Band, Sunday Sinners, and Pas Chic Chic.

Moving to the first weekend in August, the third Osheaga festival broadened its indie appeal by incorporating The Killers, a rock group, and Jack Johnson. Crowds initially complained that Johnson would muddle the festival's persona, but Farkas asserted, "…in (his) philosophy—everything fits." At this point in Osheaga's lifespan, the event was not a financial success. However, the inclusion of more recognizable headliners was intended to draw more expansive crowds. Secondary acts consisted of Metric, The Black Keys, Cat Power, and The Kills. Osheaga 2008 occurred August 2–3 at Jean Drapeau Park, Montreal.

The fourth installation of the festival originally slotted Coldplay and the Beastie Boys as the two-day event's leading performances. However, the Beastie Boys were forced to withdraw after Adam Yauch was diagnosed with a cancerous tumor in his salivary gland. Event organizers filled the opening with Yeah Yeah Yeahs, a then up and coming rock group from Brooklyn. 450 refunds were granted to attendees that requested them. Otherwise, reactions to the set change were positive. Despite these setbacks, the fourth Osheaga festival was the first edition to make a profit. Fifty acts performed on 4 stages from August 1–2, 2009, including Girl Talk, Lykke Li, Jason Mraz, the Decemberists, Arctic Monkeys, and Vampire Weekend.

In its fifth year, Osheaga welcomed Arcade Fire and a host of eclectic sets to its venues. The MEG stage was replaced by the Green stage—a wind and solar powered platform. In keeping with this environmental consciousness, free bike parking and public transit to Jean Drapeau Park was also offered. After the sale of Gillett Entertainment Group, Osheaga fell under the promotion of Evenko. However, Nick Farkas, the company's Vice President of Concerts and Events, continued to head the festival. Roughly 30% of ticket sales in 2010 came from Montreal, 20% from Ontario, and 12% from the United States.

The sixth annual Osheaga festival sold more than 81,000 tickets—more than any previous year. It was also the first three-day incarnation of the event. Eminem closed out the Friday performances, signifying a turning point in the festival's development. 38,000 attendees, the largest single-crowd seen since Osheaga's inauguration, stretched the venue's 35,000 capacity. Despite the absence of a similarly high-profile performer, the seventh edition of Osheaga in 2012 sold out at 120,000 total attendees over the three-day weekend from August 3–5, 2012. Farkas credited the surge to 2011s big-name lineup and the festival's recognition outside Montreal. Eminem’s performance inflated the festival's presence among American and European markets, making it a destination on an international scale. Headliners in 2012 included The Black Keys, Snoop Dogg, Justice, M83, MGMT, Feist, Sigur Ros, and the Jesus and Mary Chain. However, the once intimate festival layout made for reportedly frustrating navigation among such massive crowds.

In 2013, the festival continued to out-do previous sales, selling out in record time with a total of 135,000 audience members. In fact, 70% of tickets were purchased from outside the Province of Quebec. To accommodate these growing numbers, the site at Jean Drapeau Park was expanded to a 42,500-person capacity. The lineup slated Mumford & Sons, The Cure, and Beck as the main attractions, followed by Phoenix, Imagine Dragons, Vampire Weekend, Macklemore & Ryan Lewis, New Order, The Lumineers, Tegan and Sara, and Kendrick Lamar. Physical organization of the venue continued to present issues in light of foot traffic-prone crowds. "Adequate flow patterns are something we never thought of before," said Farkas. "We were always focusing on the lineup, and making it better than the last year."

Ranked by Pollster as the #1 festival in Canada and the #11 festival in the world, Osheaga has grown significantly since its inauguration. Some have criticized the pronounced commercial presence at 2013's festival; however, those same reviewers admit that the lineup quality has been well maintained since 2006. In total, the festival has presented more than 600 performances to more than 400,000 audience members.

In 2014, the festival added a sixth stage, the Valley Stage. The lineup featured headliners such as OutKast, Jack White, Arctic Monkeys, Skrillex, Lorde and The Replacements.

Line-ups

2006
River Stage
Saturday: The Magic Numbers, World Party, The Stills, Malajube, K-os, Amon Tobin, Sonic Youth
Sunday: Islands, Wolf Parade, G. Love & Special Sauce, Damian Marley, Ben Harper & the Innocent Criminals

Mountain Stage
Saturday: Grace Potter, Joseph Arthur, Vulgaires Machins, Dinosaur Jr., Metric, Clap Your Hands Say Yeah
Sunday: Starsailor, Ben Lee, DobaCaracol, Bedouin Soundclash, Kid Koala, The Flaming Lips

MEG Stage
Saturday: Crystal Cliffs, HushPuppies, Think About Life, Bush Tetras, Duchess Says, We Are Wolves, James Chance, Brazilian Girls
Sunday: Zombie, Herman Düne, Call Me Poupée, Final Fantasy, The Hidden Cameras, Bell Orchestre, Lady Sovereign

Trees Stage
Saturday: Mission District, Yoav, Major Maker, Dirty Tricks, The Colour, The Shys, Wintersleep, Born Ruffians, Matt Mays & El Torpedo
Sunday: TAM, Shoot the Moon, Tokyo Police Club, The Meligrove Band, Basia Bulat, Patrick Watson, Land of Talk, The Mongrels, Holy Fuck

Arts Lounge
Saturday: Interactive Video, Vj Pillow, Hvw8, Solid State, Ckut, Intorchao
Sunday: Vj Pillow, Hvw8, Mark Robertson, Solid State, Intorchao, Interactive Video, Kid Koala

2007

River Stage
Saturday: Rahzel, Editors, Blonde Redhead, Stars, Dumas, The Smashing Pumpkins
Sunday: The Brand New Heavies, Paolo Nutini, Martha Wainwright, Arctic Monkeys, Gotan Project, Bloc Party

Mountain Stage
Saturday: Apostle of Hustle, Jamie T, Xavier Caféine, Patrick Watson, Feist, Damien Rice
Sunday: We Are Scientists, Pascale Picard, Sam Roberts Band, Macy Gray, Interpol

MEG Stage
Saturday: Donzelle, Thunderheist, The Clientele, Santogold, Adam Kesher, Explosions in the Sky, Mike Relm
Sunday: Gray Kid, Peter von Poehl, Pas Chic Chic, Au Revoir Simone, Miracle Fortress, The Besnard Lakes, M.I.A.

Trees Stage
Saturday: Lesbo Vrouven, Ohbijou, Ideal Lovers, The Veils, The Nymphets, Panthers, Fucked Up, CPC Gangbangs, The Heights, Hank Pine and Lily Fawn
Sunday: Dragonette, The Most Serene Republic, Krief, Sunday Sinners, Pony Up, The Royal Mountain Band, Harvee, You Say Party! We Say Die!, Elsiane, Plaster

Salon Des Arts
Saturday: Justin Nozuka, Sixtoo, Maxime Robin, Tony Ezzy, Daft Punk's Electroma (film screening)
Sunday: Sixtoo, Pawa Up First, 011

2008
River Stage
Saturday: Louis XIV, N.E.R.D, Metric, Cat Power, The Killers
Sunday: Neil Halstead, Matt Costa, The Black Keys, Duffy, Jack Johnson

Mountain Stage
Saturday: Sleepercar, Spiritualized, Sharon Jones & The Dap-Kings, Iggy & The Stooges
Sunday: Rogue Wave, The Weakerthans, Gogol Bordello, Broken Social Scene

MEG Stage
Saturday: Beast, Plants and Animals, Duchess Says, DeVotchKa, Booka Shade, Sébastien Tellier
Sunday: Jamie Lidell, The Kills, MGMT, The Go! Team, CSS, Chromeo

Trees Stage
Saturday: The Wooden Sky, La Patère Rose, The Tom Fun Orchestra, Luke Doucet & The White Falcon, Le Husky, Chocolat, Payz Play, Sebastien Grainger & The Mountains, The National Parcs
Sunday: Esker Mica, Chris Velan, Cœur de pirate, Robertson, Shawn Hewitt & The National Strike, Rock Plaza Central, The Enemy, Radio Radio, Bonjour Brumaire

2009
River Stage
Saturday: Kitty Daisy & Lewis, Josh Ritter, Eagles of Death Metal, Jason Mraz, Coldplay
Sunday: The Honey Brothers, Beast, Vampire Weekend, The Decemberists, Yeah Yeah Yeahs

Mountain Stage
Saturday: Donavon Frankenreiter, Caracol, Elbow, The Roots
Sunday: The Beatnuts, The Ting Tings, Rufus Wainwright, Arctic Monkeys

MEG Stage
Saturday: NLF3, La Roux, K'naan, The Stills, Lykke Li, Girl Talk
Sunday: Yes Giantess, Miike Snow, Naïve New Beaters, Cursive, Tiga, Crystal Castles

Trees Stage
Saturday: Jesca Hoop, Silver Starling, Parlovr, Gentleman Reg, Flash Lightnin', The Rural Alberta Advantage, Chinatown, Winter Gloves, Woodhands
Sunday: Le Volume Était Au Maximum, Lanan, Lil Andy, Arkells, Amazing Baby, Ladies of the Canyon, Heartless Bastards, Hey Rosetta!, Hollerado

2010

River Stage
Saturday: The Walkmen, Sarah Harmer, Jimmy Cliff, Stars, Pavement, Arcade Fire
Sunday: Seu Jorge, The Gaslight Anthem, The Black Keys, The Cat Empire, Sonic Youth, Weezer

Mountain Stage
Saturday: Shane Murphy, Rich Aucoin, Edward Sharpe & the Magnetic Zeros, K'naan, Keane, The National
Sunday: Galactic with Cyril Neville, Ian Kelly, Ariane Moffatt, Charlie Winston, Snoop Dogg, Metric

Green Stage
Saturday: Skip The Use, Owen Pallett, Dan Black, Japandroids, Jamie Lidell, Beach House, Robyn
Sunday: Sennheiser Winner, Still Life Still, Blitzen Trapper, The Antlers, We Are Wolves, Jon Spencer Blues Explosion, Devo

Trees Stage
Saturday: Daniel Isaiah Schachter, Ingrid Michaelson, Final Flash, Little Scream, Bahamas, Avi Buffalo, Marie-Pierre Arthur, Fran Healy, The Unsettlers
Sunday: Cotton Mouth, Ariel, Hannah Georgas, Horse Feathers, Amanda Mabro, The Morning Benders, Pawa Up First, Frank Turner, Ra Ra Riot, Tim Barry

Zone Piknic Electronik
Saturday: E.S.L. with Sharivari and Skinny Bones, Roska, Mary Anne Hobbs, Hovatron, Lazer Sword, Dj Bus
Sunday: Fancyfhreek, Lunice, Major Lazer, Mossa, Round Table Knights

2011

River Stage
Friday: Kid Koala, Charles Bradley, Bran Van 3000, Eminem
Saturday: The Midway State, Hey Rosetta!, John Butler Trio, Karkwa, Death From Above 1979, Elvis Costello & The Imposters
Sunday: Typhoon, Eels, Cypress Hill, Beirut, The Tragically Hip, The Flaming Lips

Mountain Stage
Friday: The Knux, Broken Social Scene, Janelle Monáe
Saturday: The 222s, Manchester Orchestra, Tokyo Police Club, Sam Roberts Band, Lupe Fiasco, Bright Eyes
Sunday: The Sheepdogs, Frightened Rabbit, The Sounds, Malajube, City and Colour, Death Cab For Cutie

Green Stage
Friday: Lights, Glass Candy, Joseph Arthur, Timber Timbre
Saturday: Passwords, Oh Land, Braids, Twin Shadow, Sia, Ratatat, Bassnectar
Sunday: Sherlock, An Horse, Smith Westerns, The Pains of Being Pure at Heart, Ellie Goulding, White Lies, Crystal Castles, MSTRKRFT

Trees Stage
Friday: Sweet Thing, Uncle Bad Touch, Ana Tijoux, El Ten Eleven, The Rural Alberta Advantage, The Barr Brothers
Saturday: Jesuslesfilles, The High Dials, Mother Mother, The Mountain Goats, Suuns, PS I Love You, Anna Calvi, Sam Adams, Fucked Up
Sunday: Elephant Stone, Jimmy Hunt, Freedom or Death, The Luyas, Viva Brother, The Joy Formidable, The Low Anthem, Shad, Baths, Galaxie

Zone Piknic Electronik
Friday: Slim Jim, Alaclair Ensemble, Comic Strip, MC2, DJ Cosmo
Saturday: DUVALL, Egyptrixx, DâM-Funk, Jacques Greene, Robot Koch, Robot Koch, Girl Unit
Sunday: A-Rock, Shaydakiss, Dillon Francis, Jeremy Ellis, Jamie xx, Claude Von Stroke

2012

Osheaga 2012 took place August 3, 4, and 5 at Montreal's Parc Jean-Drapeau.

The final lineup was announced on July 10, 2012, and includes:

River Stage
Friday: LP, Fun, Radio Radio, Franz Ferdinand, Florence + The Machine, Justice
Saturday: The Dø, Portugal. The Man, Plants and Animals, Dumas, Garbage, Snoop Dogg
Sunday: Zeus, Aloe Blacc, Common, Passion Pit, City and Colour, The Black Keys

Mountain Stage
Friday: Charli XCX, The Walkmen, Down With Webster, Amadou & Mariam, The Weeknd, Sigur Rós
Saturday: Kathleen Edwards, Calexico, Young The Giant, Brand New, Feist
Sunday: CHAPPO, Dan Mangan, Tame Impala, Santigold, The Shins, Metric

Green Stage
Friday: Hey Ocean!, Poliça, Bombay Bicycle Club, Of Monsters and Men, Gary Clark Jr., Classified, MGMT
Saturday: Memoryhouse, The Aggrolites, Cursive, The Raveonettes, ASAP Rocky, Yeasayer, The Jesus and Mary Chain
Sunday: Peter Peter, The Airplane Boys, The Airborne Toxic Event, Austra, Woodkid, Bloc Party, M83

Trees Stage
Friday: Solids, Yukon Blonde, Freelance Whales, The Jezabels, Dum Dum Girls, Atlas Sound, Wintersleep, Half Moon Run, Les Breastfeeders
Saturday: Propofol, Karim Ouellet, Kandle, Black Lips, Young Galaxy, Arkells, Avec pas d'casque, The Death Set, The Sheepdogs
Sunday: Doe Paoro, Zola Jesus, Koriass, Michael Kiwanuka, James Vincent McMorrow, Sandro Perri, The Black Angels, Asexuals, Keys N Krate

Zone Piknic Electronik
Friday: Funkyfalz, Prison Garde, Mak 10 & Hyper MC, Huoratron
Saturday: Simon Called Peter, Kaytradamus, Nosaj Thing, Brandt Brauer Frick, SBTRKT, Little Dragon,
Adventure Club,
Sunday: Vosper, Zombie Disco Squad, Le Matos, Buraka Som Sistema, Madeon, Wolfgang Gartner, Knife Party

The 2012 edition of the festival sold 120 000 tickets in total.

2013
Osheaga 2013 took place August 2 through August 4 at Montreal's Parc Jean-Drapeau.

River Stage

Friday: Capital Cities, Oberhofer, Ben Howard, Two Door Cinema Club, Vampire Weekend, The Cure

Saturday: Raine Maida, The Heavy, Flogging Molly, Tegan and Sara, Imagine Dragons, Beck

Sunday: Twin Forks, Frightened Rabbit, Charles Bradley and His Extraordinaries, Big Boi, Kendrick Lamar, Mumford & Sons

Mountain Stage

Friday: k-os, Daughter, Alt-J, Ellie Goulding, Phoenix

Saturday: Grouplove, Tokyo Police Club, Jimmy Eat World, Stars, K-os, Macklemore & Ryan Lewis

Sunday: Atlas Genius, Jessie Ware, Silversun Pickups, The Lumineers, New Order

Green Stage

Friday: Majical Cloudz, Guards, DIIV, Lianne La Havas, Jake Bugg, The Gaslight Anthem, Beach House

Saturday: Wild Nothing, Yelawolf, Lou Doillon, Tricky, The Breeders, Explosions in the Sky, C2C

Sunday: MNDR, Bad Things, Little Green Cars, Icona Pop, Holy Ghost!, Father John Misty, Misteur Valaire, Hot Chip

Tree Stage

Friday: Ponctuation, Hyphen Hyphen, Wild Belle, The Head and the Heart, Palma Violets, Cafeine, Diamond Rings, Rich Aucoin

Saturday: Corb Lund, Groenland, Deap Vally, Loud Lary Ajust, Frank Turner, Bob Mould, We Are Wolves, Angel Haze

Sunday: Nightbox, Les sœurs Boulay, Shovels & Rope, Hannah Georgas, Dusted, Hollerado, The Neighbourhood, Death Grips

Zone Piknic Electronik

Friday: Millimetrik, EC Twins, Carnage, Kidnap Kid, Rudimental, Vilify & Henward, Jets, Baauer, A Tribe Called Red

Saturday: Humans, Rone, Amtrac, Cajmere, Soul Clap, Azari & III, Bonobo, Style of Eye, Jacques Lu Cont, Porter Robinson

Sunday: DVBBS, Odezenne, Robert DeLong, Floating Points, Jackmaster, The Knocks, Gramatik, Tommy Trash, Disclosure, Pretty Lights

2014
Osheaga 2014 took place August 1 through August 3 at Montreal's Parc Jean-Drapeau.

River Stage

Friday: Bleachers, Old Crow Medicine Show, Sam Roberts Band, Foster the People, Outkast

Saturday: Kevin Drew, Against Me!, Local Natives, HAIM, J. Cole, Jack White

Sunday: Matt Mays, Bombay Bicycle Club, Portugal. The Man, Kodaline, The Replacements, Arctic Monkeys

Mountain Stage

Friday: The Royal Streets, Manchester Orchestra, Awolnation, Childish Gambino, Skrillex

Saturday: Kongos, Serena Ryder, Volcano Choir, Modest Mouse, Nick Cave & The Bad Seeds

Sunday: Hey Rosetta!, The Kooks, CHVRCHES, Half Moon Run, Lorde

Valley Stage

Friday: Dear Frederic, The Beaches, Mahaut Mondino, Von Pariahs, White Denim

Saturday: The Belle Game, Reuben and the Dark, Courtney Barnett, Bas, The Dismemberment Plan

Sunday: Joëlle Saint-Pierre, Joywave, Cherub, Royal Blood, Wild Cub

Green Stage

Friday: The Mowgli's, Motel Raphaël, Pusha T, London Grammar, Chromeo, Band of Horses

Saturday: Wildlife, St. Lucia, Ingrid Michaelson, Phantogram, Basia Bulat, Danny Brown, SBTRKT

Sunday: Wake Owl, Travis Scott, AFI, The Temper Trap, Cut Copy, Gogol Bordello, Lykke Li

Trees Stage

Friday: Le Trouble, July Talk, Hospitality, Alex Nevsky, Bear Mountain, The Men, Mac DeMarco

Saturday: Royal Canoe, Wild Child, Jimmy Hunt, Reignwolf, !!!, Young & Sick, Joey Bada$$

Sunday: Foxtrott, Vance Joy, Kate Nash, Temples, Kid Ink, Jagwar Ma, Dead Obies

Piknic Electronik Stage

Friday: Dream Koala, Odesza, Ryan Hemsworth, Shlohmo, Bro Safari, Clockwork, Flume, Jacques Green, Chase & Status

Saturday: Beat Market, Savoy, Kaytranada, Breach, Four Tet, Jon Hopkins, Gesaffelstein, Laurent Garnier

Sunday: Henry Krinkle, Basecamp, Tom Trago, Cyril Hahn, Duke Dumont, Tchami, Tiga, Zomboy, The Glitch Mob

2015
Osheaga 2015 took place July 31 through August 2 at Montreal's Parc Jean-Drapeau.

River Stage

Friday: Catfish and the Bottlemen, Iron & Wine with Ben Bridwell, Angus & Julia Stone, The Decemberists, The Avett Brothers,  Florence + The Machine

Saturday: The Rural Alberta Advantage, Arkells, St. Vincent, Ben Harper & the Innocent Criminals, Patrick Watson, Kendrick Lamar

Sunday: X Ambassadors, James Bay, Father John Misty, The War on Drugs, Edward Sharpe & The Magnetic Zeros, The Black Keys

Mountain Stage

Friday: Grace Potter. George Ezra, Marina and The Diamonds, Stars & Friends, Of Monsters and Men

Saturday: X Prime, Young the Giant, Milky Chance, Interpol, Weezer

Sunday: Ryn Weaver, Gary Clark Jr, Future Islands, Hot Chip, Alt-J

Valley Stage

Friday: Strand of Oaks, Shakey Graves, Bahamas, Twenty One Pilots, G-Eazy, Young Fathers

Saturday: Leikeli47, Seoul, Pierre Kwenders, Alvvays, Desaparecidos, Ariane Moffatt

Sunday: Cordelia & The Buffalo, Glass Animals, Sylvan Esso, First Aid Kit, Broods, Banks

Green Stage

Friday: John Jacob Magistery, The Franklin Electric, Run The Jewels, The Kills, Chet Faker, FKA Twigs, Schoolboy Q

Saturday: Bernhari, carte blanche to Karim Ouellet, Narcy with Yasiin Bey (aka Mos Def), Christine and the Queens, Nas, Kygo, Caribou

Sunday: SZA, Raury, MS MR, Charli XCX, Brand New, Tove Lo, Tyler, The Creator

Trees Stage

Friday: PONI, DMA's, Guster, Milk & Bone, The Thurston Moore Band, Viet Cong,

Saturday: Leisure Cruise, The OBGMs, Lion Babe, Bishop Nehru, Anamanaguchi, Nothing

Sunday: Jessica Hernandez & the Deltas, Coasts, San Fermin, Toro y Moi, Philip Selway, Klô Pelgag, EZ3kiel

Piknic Electronik Stage

Friday: CRi, Skylar Spence, Sango, Tommy Kruise, Hermitude, Cashmere Cat, Brodinski, GTA, RL Grime, A Tribe Called Red

Saturday: Das Mörtal, Peking Duk, Slow Magic, Klangkarussell, Daphni, Oliver Heldens, What So Not, Hudson Mohawke, Art Department, Robin Schulz

Sunday: Boundary, Thylacine, Bob Moses, N'TO, Goldroom, The Black Madonna, Dusky, Zhu

2016
Osheaga 2016 took place July 29 through July 31 at Montreal's Parc Jean-Drapeau.

River Stage

Friday: Banners, Kaleo, Silversun Pickups, Beirut, Half Moon Run, Red Hot Chili Peppers

Saturday: Night Riots, July Talk, The Barr Brothers, The Arcs, HAIM,  Lana Del Rey

Sunday: MØ, The Cat Empire, Leon Bridges, M83, Radiohead

Mountain Stage

Friday: Dragonette, Elle King, Passenger, Cypress Hill, The Lumineers

Saturday: MisterWives, Daughter, Kurt Vile & The Violators, Bastille, Death Cab For Cutie

Sunday: Melanie Martinez, BØRNS, Foals, Grimes, Gramatik

Green Stage

Friday: Caveboy, Jeremy Loops, GoldLink, Wolf Parade, Bloc Party, The Underachievers, Flume

Saturday: Charlotte Cardin, Coleman Hell, Lucius, Logic, Best Coast, The Last Shadow Puppets, Future

Sunday: SonReal, The Paper Kites, St. Lucia, Skepta, Nathaniel Rateliff & The Night Sweats, Tory Lanez, Mac Miller

Valley Stage

Friday: Elephant Stone, Jack Garratt, Oh Wonder, The Wombats, Years & Years, Vince Staples

Saturday: The Damn Truth, Frances, Charlotte Cardin, Post Malone, Cœur de pirate, Jazz Cartier

Sunday: Alex G, The Struts, The Strumbellas, Nothing But Thieves, Koriass, Dead Obies

Trees Stage

Friday: La famille Ouellette, Safia Nolin, Dear Rouge, White Lung, Marian Hill, Låpsley

Saturday: Noé, Hiatus Kaiyote, Foreign Diplomats, Cloves, Busty and the Bass, AURORA

Sunday: Israel Nash, Foy Vance, Dilly Dally, Little Simz, HÆLOS, Allie X

Piknic Electronik Stage

Friday: Haute, Classixx, Snakehips, Sophie, Hi-Lo, Boris Brejcha, Paul Kalkbrenner, Boys Noize

Saturday: Tennyson, Feder, Fakear, The Range, Mura Masa, Kaytranada, Todd Terje & The Olsens

Sunday: Le Matos, Lane 8, RÜFÜS DU SOL, Keys N Krates, Baauer, Evian Christ

2017

Osheaga 2017 took place August 4 through August 6 at Montreal's Parc Jean-Drapeau. There were some cancellations because of inclement weather and travel difficulties:

River Stage

Friday: Barns Courtney, Angel Olsen, Glass Animals, Tove Lo, MGMT, Lorde

Saturday: Heat, The Damn Truth, Dawes, Cage the Elephant, Tory Lanez, Muse

Sunday: Cherry Glazerr, Bishop Briggs, Local Natives, Run the Jewels, Vance Joy, The Weeknd

Mountain Stage

Friday: Joseph, Muna, London Grammar, The Shins, Milky Chance, Justice

Saturday: Gordi, Plants and Animals, Jain, Liam Gallagher, Broken Social Scene, Major Lazer

Sunday: Middle Kids, Zara Larsson, Phantogram, Tegan and Sara, Foster the People, Alabama Shakes

Green Stage

Friday: Grace Mitchell,  BadBadNotGood, BadBadNotGood, Car Seat Headrest, Rag'n'Bone Man, Russ

Saturday: Heartstreets, Peter Peter, Yung Lean, Danny Brown, Arkells, Majid Jordan, Choir! Choir! Choir!

Sunday: Bibi Bourelly, The Districts, Denzel Curry, Little Dragon, Foxygen, Death from Above 1979

Valley Stage

Friday: Samito, Blaenavon, Sampha, Belle and Sebastian, 6lack

Saturday: Le Couleur, Beach Slang, Temples, Honne, Jon Bellion, Father John Misty

Sunday: Rosie Valland, Ho99o9, Whitney, Mick Jenkins, Flatbush Zombies, Die Antwoord

Tree Stage

Friday: Vulvets, Andy Shauf, Leif Vollebekk, Geoffroy, Maggie Rogers, Hamilton Leithauser, Strand of Oaks, Choir! Choir! Choir!

Saturday: Olivia Swann, Men I Trust, The Sick Things, Daniel Caesar, Kroy, PUP, Cloud Nothings

Sunday: Skott, Jacob Banks, Harrison Brome, The Lemon Twigs, Sohn, Lido

Island Stage

Friday: Lophiile, The Geek x VRV, The Funk Hunters, Matoma, Sam Gellaitry, Mija, Griz, Snails, Zeds Dead

Saturday: Harrison, CRi (Live), River Tiber, Sofi Tukker, Grandbudda (Live), Petit Biscuit, Rone (live), Fritz Kalkbrenner (Live), Nicolas Jaar (Live)

Sunday: Bernardino Femminielli (Live), Bjarki (Live), Weval (Live), DJ Tennis, Kink (Live), Daniel Avery, Crystal Castles, Nina Kraviz

Perrier Greenhouse

Friday: Rue de Bois, Shaydakiss B2B A-Rock, Sophie Jones, Pierre Kwenders, The Funk Hunters, Hoodies at Night

Saturday: DJ Psychology, Karim Ouellet, Future Shark, Harrison, Jillionaire, Young Galaxy (DJ Set), Teo Nio & CRSB

Sunday: Kyle Kalma, Brendan Canning, Shash'U, Tommy Kruise, Derek Wise ft. Yungshrimptempura, Beat Market

2018
Osheaga 2018 took place August 3 through August 5 at Montreal's Parc Jean-Drapeau.

River Stage

Friday: Sir Sly, Rainbow Kitten Surprise, Jenny Lewis, St. Vincent, Yeah Yeah Yeahs, Travis Scott

Saturday: Lights, LANY, LP, Blondie, Khalid, Arctic Monkeys

Sunday: Alex Lahey, Lauv, The Neighbourhood, Dua Lipa, Post Malone, Florence + The Machine

Mountain Stage

Friday: LÉON, Matt Holubowski, Manchester Orchestra, Chromeo, Portugal. The Man, Odesza

Saturday: Alice Merton, Bedouin Soundclash, Chronixx, Bahamas, Future Islands, Anderson Paak & The Free Nationals

Sunday: Lewis Capaldi, A R I Z O N A, Trombone Shorty & Orleans Avenue, Tash Sultana, James Bay, The National

Green Stage

Friday: Amy Shark, Quinn XCII, Sylvan Esso, Smokepurpp, Rae Sremmurd, James Blake

Saturday: John Jacob Magistery, Rymz, Alvvays, Allan Rayman, Lord Huron, Tyler, the Creator

Sunday: Cuco, Dermot Kennedy, GoldLink, Jungle, Franz Ferdinand, Brockhampton

Valley Stage

Friday: Birds of Bellwoods, Alex Cameron, BAZZI, Rex Orange County, NAV, Lykke Li

Saturday: Paupière, Son Little, Milk & Bone, Kali Uchis, Calpurnia, Billie Eilish, De La Soul

Sunday: Langston Francis, Kallitechnis, Noname, BØRNS, Blood Orange, DVSN

Tree Stage

Friday: Ron Gallo, Jack Harlow, Julien Baker, Essaie Pas, Cigarettes After Sex, Killy

Saturday: luhx., Ponctuation, Terror Jr, The Beaches, Loud, Carpenter Brut,

Sunday: LaF, Saint Jhn, Dizzy, The Brooks, Slaves, Rapsody

Island Stage

Friday: The Fitness, Jets, Walker & Royce, Billy Kenny, Yotto, LAFF TRAX, Leon Vynehall, Dixon,

Saturday: Ducky, Parker, AC Slater, Tokimonsta, Ookay, A-Trak, San Holo, Alan Walker, REZZ

Sunday: Milu Milpop, Julia Gover, Feder, Gorgon City, Modeselektor, Kölsch, Chris Liebing,

Perrier Greenhouse

Friday: Future Shark, Milk & Bone, Machinedrum, Bonbon Kojak, Made of Oak, DJ YO-C

Saturday: Debbie Tebbs, Killa-Jewel, Heartstreets, Chippy Nonstop, Future Shark, Psychology

Sunday: La Bronze, Adjust b2b DJ Manifest, Shash'U, Planet Giza, Voyage Funktastique, Lex & Wood

2019
Osheaga 2019 took place August 2 through August 4 at Montreal's Parc Jean-Drapeau.

River Stage

Friday: Dear Rouge, St. Paul & The Broken Bones, Denzel Curry, Interpol, MSTRKRFT, The Lumineers

Saturday: bülow, Ravyn Lenae, King Princess, ScHoolboy Q, City and Colour, The Chemical Brothers

Sunday: Mallrat, The Franklin Electric, Sigrid, Mac DeMarco, Hozier, Childish Gambino

Mountain Stage

Friday: Tom Walker, Dean Lewis, Rosalía, Gucci Mane, Flume

Saturday: U.S. Girls, Lennon Stella, Young the Giant, Janelle Monáe, Logic

Sunday: Nilüfer Yanya, Alec Benjamin, Normani, Metric, Tame Impala

Green Stage

Friday: Naya Ali, JPEGMAFIA, Kodaline, Mick Jenkins, Mitski, $uicideboy$

Saturday: Iaye, Saba, Young Thug, grandson, Rüfüs Du Sol, A Boogie Wit Da Hoodie

Sunday: Fontaines D.C., Anders, Real Estate, Koffee, Kaytranada, The Glorious Sons

Valley Stage

Friday: Bayonne, Ryan Beatty, Sharon Van Etten, Gunna, Joji, Kurt Vile & The Violators

Saturday: Braids, MorMor, BAS, Two Feet, Sofi Tukker, Beach House

Sunday: Bad Child, Taylor Bennett, Sam Fender, Rejjie Snow, Tierra Whack, Ski Mask the Slump God

Tree Stage

Friday: Roy Juno, We Are Monroe, TEKE::TEKE, NoMBe, Francis and the Lights, 070 Shake

Saturday: Munya, Anemone, Sales, Les Louanges, Yellow Days, Reignwolf

Sunday: O.G.B., Sara Diamond, FouKi, Bea Miller, Boy Pablo, Hayley Kiyoko

Island Stage

Friday: Laura Escudé, Beating Heart presents Saronde, Hito, Bob Moses, Fisher, Ouri, Charlotte de Witte

Saturday: Radiant Baby, Robotaki, Dr. Fresch, Vladimir Cauchemar, Said The Sky, FKJ, Black Tiger Sex Machine, Louis The Child, GRiZ

Sunday: Jerico, BAMBII, CRi, Monolink, DJ Koze, Agoria, The Black Madonna, SebastiAn

2020 (cancelled due to COVID-19)
Osheaga 2020, originally scheduled to take place from July 31 to August 2, was cancelled due to the COVID-19 pandemic. Musicians who had committed to appear at the show included the Foo Fighters, Lizzo, and Kendrick Lamar.

2021 (cancelled again due to COVID-19)
Osheaga 2021 was scheduled to take place from July 30 to August 1, initial musicians for the festival include Cardi B, Foo Fighters, Post Malone and possibly more to come.  On April 22, 2021, it was announced that the 2021 edition of the festival was cancelled for the second year in a row due to the ongoing COVID-19 crisis.

2021 - Osheaga Get Together
Evenko decided to host a mini Osheaga with Canadian artist from October 1 to October 3.

River Stage

 Friday: Ruby Waters, Soran, Odie, The Franklin Electric, Charlotte Cardin
 Saturday: Isabella Lovestory, Haviah Mighty, Zach Zoya, Faouzia, Roy Woods, Jessie Reyez
 Sunday: Les Shirley, AXLAUSTADE, Stars, Allan Rayman, Half Moon Run

Mountain Stage

 Friday: Magi Merlin, JJ Wilde, Jessia, Bülow, DVSN
 Saturday: Fernie, QCLTUR, Killy, LANY, Majid Jordan
 Sunday: Valence, The Damn Truth, July Talk, Geoffroy

2022
Osheaga 2022 took place between July 29 to July 31. Unfortunately, various artists from the original lineup were unable to attend this year's festival, including headliners Foo Fighters, due to the passing of the band's drummer Taylor Hawkins and A$AP Rocky, therefore these performers were replaced.

River Stage

Friday: Tones and I, Dominic Fike, Charli XCX, Arcade Fire

Saturday: Faouzia, Tove Lo, Arkells, Khruangbin, Future

Sunday: Sam Fender, Chelsea Cutler, Royal Blood, Glass Animals, Dua Lipa

Mountain Stage

Friday: Gus Dapperton, Ashe, The Kid LAROI, Yeah Yeah Yeahs

Saturday: MONOWHALES, LANY, Bleachers, Mitski, Burna Boy

Sunday: Boy Golden & the Church of Better Daze, Gracie Abrams, Ashnikko, Girl in Red, Machine Gun Kelly

Valley Stage

Friday: Fredz, PinkPantheress, Local Natives, Turnstile, Big Sean

Saturday: Magi Merlin, Sampa The Great, Tai Verdes, slowthai, Polo & Pan

Sunday: Coco & Clair Clair, Mahalia, Tinashe, Lucy Dacus, Cordae

Green Stage

Friday: Group Project, Lolo Zouaï, Jacob Banks, Parcels, 6lack, Kygo

Saturday: Luna Li, WizTheMc, Men I Trust, Freddie Gibbs, 100 gecs, Porter Robinson

Sunday: Genesis Owusu, Zack Zoya, Inhaler, Laylow, SAINt JHN, IDLES

Tree Stage

Friday: Brandon Harris, Robert Robert, King Hannah, Claudia Bouvette, Les Louanges, Pi'erre Bourne

Saturday: Edwin Raphael, Pierre Kwenders, Skiifall, Sophia Bel, Geoffroy, JP Saxe

Sunday: Emile Bourgault, La Doña, Sad Night Dynamite, Safia Nolin, Wet Leg, The Halluci Nation

Island Stage

Friday: Bolarinho, Miane, Evan Giia, John Summit, Malaa, Meduza, Chris Lake

Saturday: San Farafina, Qrion, Daphni, Sébastian Léger, Worakls, TSHA, Caribou

Sunday: Ceréna, LP Giobbi, MitiS, Giolì and Assia, Apashe, Alan Walker, Seven Lions

2023
Osheaga 2023 is scheduled to take place from August 4th through 6th. RÜFÜS DU SOL, Billie Eilish, and Kendrick Lamar were announced as the headliners on December 14th.

See also
 ÎleSoniq Music Festival, music festival at Parc Jean-Drapeau
 Heavy Montreal, music festival at Parc Jean-Drapeau
 Piknic Électronik, weekly electronic music festival at Parc Jean-Drapeau during summer

References

External links

 Osheaga Festival

Rock festivals in Canada
Parc Jean-Drapeau
Music festivals in Montreal
Recurring events established in 2006
Pop music festivals in Canada